The Civil Lines Metro Station is located on the Yellow Line of the Delhi Metro  in the Civil Lines area of Delhi.

Station layout

Facilities
There are ATMs at Civil Lines metro station, along with a cafe and public bathrooms.

Entry/Exist
Gate Number : 1

Sant Parmanand Hospital

Gate Number : 2

IP College

Gate Number : 3

Oberoi Maidens Hotel

Connections
To HUDA city centre and Kashmiri gate

See also
List of Delhi Metro stations
Transport in Delhi
Delhi Metro Rail Corporation
Delhi Suburban Railway
Delhi Transport Corporation
North Delhi
National Capital Region (India)
List of rapid transit systems
List of metro systems

References

External links

 Delhi Metro Rail Corporation Ltd. (Official site) 
 Delhi Metro Annual Reports
 

Delhi Metro stations
Railway stations opened in 2004
Railway stations in North Delhi district
2004 establishments in Delhi